John Spence Community High School (formerly Preston High School) is a co-educational secondary school located in Preston (near North Shields) in Tyne and Wear, England.

It is a foundation school administered by North Tyneside Council.

John Spence Community High School offers GCSEs and BTECs as programmes of study for pupils. The school was also awarded specialist Sports College status in 2001 and continues to offers sports as a specialism. The school also offers adult education courses through the North Tyneside Adult Learning Alliance.

Notable former pupils

Sam Fender (musician and Brit Award winner)
Sean Longstaff (professional footballer)
Matty Longstaff (professional footballer)
Stephen Murray (former BMX dirt rider)
Matthew Parr (Olympic figure skater)
Hilton Valentine (former guitarist for The Animals)

References

External links
John Spence Community High School official website

Secondary schools in the Metropolitan Borough of North Tyneside
Foundation schools in the Metropolitan Borough of North Tyneside